Mother and Daughter Seated (also known as Mother and Daughter, seated and Madre e Hija Sentadas) is a 1971 outdoor bronze sculpture by Francisco Zúñiga, installed at Balboa Park in San Diego, in the U.S. state of California. It is part of the collection of the San Diego Museum of Art.

See also
 1971 in art

References

1971 establishments in California
1971 sculptures
Bronze sculptures in California
Outdoor sculptures in San Diego
Sculptures of the San Diego Museum of Art
Sculptures of women in California